The 2015 NCAA Division I Cross Country Championships were the 77th NCAA Men's Division I Cross Country Championship and the 35th NCAA Women's Division I Cross Country Championship to determine the national champions of men's and women's NCAA Division I collegiate cross country running. It was held at E. P. "Tom" Sawyer State Park in Louisville, Kentucky and was hosted by the University of Louisville on November 21, 2015. Four different championships were contested: men's and women's individual and team championships.

Syracuse won the men's team championship, their first since 1951. Oregon's Edward Cheserek won the men's individual event, his third consecutive championship. Cheserek joined Gerry Lindgren, Steve Prefontaine, and Henry Rono as the event's only three-time champions.

New Mexico won the women's team championship, their first. It was UNM's first women's team national championship in any sport.  Notre Dame's Molly Seidel won the individual event.

Men's title
Distance: 10,000 meters

Men's Team Result (Top 10)

(H) – Host team

Men's Individual Result (Top 10)

Women's title
Distance: 6,000 meters

Women's Team Result (Top 10)

Women's Individual Result (Top 10)

See also
 NCAA Men's Division II Cross Country Championship 
 NCAA Women's Division II Cross Country Championship 
 NCAA Men's Division III Cross Country Championship 
 NCAA Women's Division III Cross Country Championship

References
 

NCAA Cross Country Championships
NCAA Division I Cross Country Championships
NCAA Division I Cross Country Championships
Sports competitions in Louisville, Kentucky
Track and field in Kentucky
NCAA Division I Cross Country Championships
University of Louisville